CIMS is an acronym. It may refer to:

CIMS-FM, the French-language Canadian radio station 
Coordinated Incident Management System, New Zealand's system for coordinating its emergency services
Courant Institute of Mathematical Sciences, a research division of New York University
Content Management Interoperability Services, a standards proposal for sharing information among disparate content repositories
Carleton Immersive Media Studio
Care Institute of Medical Sciences (CIMS), Ahmedabad, a multi-speciality hospital in Gujarat, India
Chhattisgarh Institute of Medical Sciences, a medical college in city of Bilaspur, Chhattisgarh, India